Bagh Pay Astan (also Romanized as Bāgh Pāy Āstān) is a village in Kunani Rural District, Kunani District, Kuhdasht County, Lorestan Province, Iran. At the 2006 census, its population was 79, in 17 families.

References 

Towns and villages in Kuhdasht County